Thomasville City School District  is a school district in Clarke County, Alabama.

External links
 

Education in Clarke County, Alabama